Ravna is a village in northwestern Bulgaria, part of the Chiprovtsi Municipality in the Montana Province.

Villages in Montana Province
Chiprovtsi Municipality